Christopher Hill (born March 11, 1994) is an American soccer defender who last played for Penn FC in the USL.

Hill grew up in Farmingdale, New Jersey and attended Howell High School.

Career

Youth and college
Hill played soccer at Richmond University in 2012, where he recorded two goals and two assists as a freshman, starting in 16 of the team's 18 matches. After the men's soccer program had been cut by the school, Hill transferred to Villanova University in 2013, where he stayed for three years. In his first season at Villanova, as a sophomore, Hill led the team in goals and points as a midfielder, before switching to a defensive role. In his junior year, he helped the team to a top 12 defensive ranking among Division 1 teams in the NCAA. He started in all games he played in during both his junior and senior years.

Professional
Hill signed with United Soccer League side Harrisburg City Islanders on March 26, 2016.

References

External links

1994 births
Living people
American soccer players
Howell High School (New Jersey) alumni
Richmond Spiders men's soccer players
Villanova Wildcats men's soccer players
Penn FC players
Association football defenders
Soccer players from New Jersey
People from Farmingdale, New Jersey
Sportspeople from Monmouth County, New Jersey
USL Championship players